This is a list of episodes for the 1970s American television series Wonder Woman featuring Lynda Carter.

Series overview
All three seasons and the TV film pilot have been released on DVD by Warner Home Video, including a complete series DVD set titled Wonder Woman: The Complete Collection on November 6, 2007.

Episodes

TV film pilot (1975)

Season 1 (1976–77)

Season 2 (1977–78)

Season 3 (1978–79)

References

External links
 

Lists of American fantasy television series episodes
 Episodes
Wonder Woman in other media
Lists of DC Comics television series episodes
Lists of American action television series episodes